Suffolk Downs was horse race track in Boston, Massachusetts.

Suffolk Downs may also refer to:

Suffolk Downs station, in Boston, Massachusetts, United States
Suffolk Downs (LIRR station), a former train station in Hampton Bays, New York, United States

See also
Mildenhall Stadium, known as Suffolk Downs when staging greyhound racing